Fearless Fighters, also known as Ninja Killers or A Real Man, is a 1971 Hong Kong-Taiwanese wuxia film starring Shaw Brothers Studio veteran actors Chan Hung-lit and Yik Yuen and a cast from Hong Kong and Taiwan.

Plot 
To Pa and several members of his Eagle Claw Fighting Clan are repulsed in their attempt to rob government gold by Chen Chen Chow, the Lightning Whipper. The clan does a second attack and is successful in getting the gold and also fatally wounding the Lightning Whipper. However, Lei Peng executes a surprise move, gets the gold, and plans to return it to the government. But the vengeful To Pa convinces the police that Lei Peng is the robber, and Lei Peng is arrested and jailed. To Pa murders Lei Peng's entire family, with the exception of a son who escapes and is befriended by the mysterious Lady Tieh. To Pa gets the gold again and takes it to his hideout. Then Chen and Mu Lan, the Lighting Whipper's son and daughter, rescue Lei Peng from jail. Lady Tieh, Lei Peng, Chen and Mu Lan band together as the Fearless Fighters and go after To Pa.

Cast
Chan Hung-lit as The Killer
Yik Yuen as Lei Peng/Lei Pong
Chang Ching-ching as Mu Lan
Chiang Ming as Chen
Mo Man-hung as To Pa
Ma Kei as Chen Chen-chow
Mo Man-ha as Lady Tieh
Wong Fei-lung
Kwan Hung

External links

1971 films
1971 martial arts films
1971 action films
Hong Kong action films
Hong Kong martial arts films
Taiwanese martial arts films
Wuxia films
Kung fu films
Mandarin-language films
1970s Hong Kong films